John Bond (1 January 1802 – 18 March 1844) was a British politician. He was the Tory Member of Parliament for Corfe Castle, 1823–1828.
He resigned from Parliament on 8 February 1828, accepting the Stewardship of the Chiltern Hundreds. He was then the High Sheriff of Dorset 1830 to 1831.

References

1802 births
1844 deaths
UK MPs 1820–1826
UK MPs 1826–1830
High Sheriffs of Dorset
Members of the Parliament of the United Kingdom for English constituencies
Tory MPs (pre-1834)